Blinded by the Light is a 1980 American made-for-television drama film directed by John A. Alonzo and starring Kristy and Jimmy McNichol. The film is based upon a Robin F. Brancato novel.

Premise
David Bowers is a teenager who runs away from home to join a quasi-religious cult. His sister Janet is determined to find him, but almost winds up getting brainwashed by the cult herself.

Cast
Kristy McNichol as Janet Bowers
Jimmy McNichol as David Bowers
Anne Jackson as Frances Bowers
Michael McGuire as Ed Bowers
Jenny O'Hara as Rose
Phillip R. Allen as Dr. Brockton
Ben Bottoms as Scott
Sandy McPeak as Max
Keith Andes as Father Adam
Gail Edwards as Zora
Grace Zabriskie

References

External links

1980 television films
1980 films
1980 drama films
Films directed by John A. Alonzo
CBS network films
Fictional cults
Films shot in Los Angeles
American drama television films
1980s English-language films
1980s American films